Henry Raschen (October 2, 1856August 24, 1937) was a German-born American painter. He did paintings of California landscapes and Native Americans.

Early life
Raschen was born on October 2, 1856 in Germany. He emigrated to the United States with his family in 1868, and he grew up in Fort Ross, California.

Raschen attended the San Francisco Art Association, and he studied under Charles Christian Nahl in California. From 1875 to 1883, he studied in Germany.

Career
Raschen maintained a studio on Montgomery Street in San Francisco, where he painted Native Americans and California landscapes. Notable patrons included Richard T. Crane, King C. Gillette, E. H. Harriman, James Stillman, Isidor Straus, Charles Lee Tilden, and William Wrigley Jr. Another collector, Harry Flayderman, self-published a catalog of his work in 1958.

His artwork can be seen at the Brooklyn Museum in New York City, the Oakland Museum of California, the American Museum of Western Art – The Anschutz Collection in Denver, Colorado.

Personal life and death
Raschen resided in San Francisco until 1906, when he moved to 1307 16th Avenue in Oakland, California. He had a daughter, Mary Coburn.

Raschen died on August 24, 1937 in Oakland, at age 82.

Further reading

References

1856 births
1937 deaths
German emigrants to the United States
People from Oldenburg (city)
Artists from San Francisco
Artists from Oakland, California
Painters from California
German male painters
19th-century German painters
19th-century American male artists
20th-century German painters
American male painters
19th-century American painters
20th-century American painters
20th-century American male artists
American landscape painters
American portrait painters